Karelasyon is a weekly anthology of inspiring stories on GMA Network aired every Saturday. Karelasyon features the life experiences of famous personalities and ordinary people who loved and lost on their way to success. The show is presented by Carla Abellana.

Series overview

Episode list

2015

2016

2017

References

Lists of anthology television series episodes
Lists of Philippine drama television series episodes